The 1st Messina Grand Prix was a motor race, run to Formula Junior rules, held on 23 August 1959 at Ganzirri Lake circuit in Messina, Italy. The race was part of the Italian Formula Junior Championship.

Final standings

References

External links
 I Gran Premio di Messina Junior (race full report)

Messina Grand Prix